Jack Hathaway (born 1982) is a commander in the United States Navy and NASA astronaut candidate. He is from South Windsor, Connecticut.

Early life and education
Hathaway was born and raised in South Windsor, Connecticut. Jack Hathaway graduated from South Windsor High School in South Windsor, Connecticut in 2000. He earned a bachelor's degree in physics and history from the U.S. Naval Academy in 2004. Earned a master degree of science in flight dynamics from Cranfield University in 2014. Earned a master's in national security and strategic studies from the U.S. Naval War College.

Career
Hathaway attended the U.S. Naval Academy and was commissioned into the Navy in 2004 upon graduation. He was assigned to Naval Air Station, Lemoore, California, for transition to the F/A-18E. He graduated from Empire Test Pilots’ School, supported the Joint Chiefs of Staff at the Pentagon, and was most recently assigned as the prospective executive officer for VFA-81. He has more than 2,500 flight hours in 30+ types of aircraft, more than 500 carrier landings, and flew 39 combat missions.

Astronaut candidacy
On December 6, 2021, he was revealed to be one of the 10 candidates selected in the 2021 NASA Astronaut Group 23. He will report for duty in January 2022.

References
 

Living people
United States Naval Academy alumni
Alumni of Cranfield University
Astronaut candidates
1982 births